Steganographia is a book on steganography, written in c. 1499 by the German Benedictine abbot and polymath Johannes Trithemius.

General
Trithemius' most famous work, Steganographia (written c. 1499; published Frankfurt, 1606), was placed on the Index Librorum Prohibitorum in 1609 and removed in 1900. This book is in three volumes, and appears to be about magic—specifically, about using spirits to communicate over long distances. However, since the publication of a decryption key to the first two volumes in 1606, they have been known to be actually concerned with cryptography and steganography. Until recently, the third volume was widely still believed to be solely about magic, but the "magical" formulae have now been shown to be covertexts for yet more material on cryptography.

Reception
Mentions within the third book of the magical work by such figures as Agrippa and John Dee still lend credence to the idea of a mystic-magical foundation concerning the third volume. Additionally, while Trithemius's steganographic methods can be established to be free of the need for angelic–astrological mediation, still left intact is an underlying theological motive for their contrivance. The preface to the Polygraphia equally establishes the everyday practicability of cryptography was conceived by Trithemius as a "secular consequent of the ability of a soul specially empowered by God to reach, by magical means, from earth to Heaven". Robert Hooke suggested, in the chapter Of Dr. Dee's Book of Spirits, that John Dee used Trithemian steganography to conceal his communication with Queen Elizabeth I.

See also
Greek Magical Papyri
History of cryptography

References

External links
Steganographia in english (Trithemius.com)

Steganography
Cryptography books
Occult books